Sidney Algier (December 5, 1889 – April 24, 1945) was an American actor, film director and screenwriter. He was married to Wava Roberts. He was born in Shamokin, Pennsylvania, and died in Sawtelle, Los Angeles, of a heart attack at the age of 55.

Filmography

Assistant director
Lovers? (1927)
The Gay Deceiver (1926)
Memory Lane (1926)
Fine Clothes (1925)
Husbands and Lovers (1924)
Why Men Leave Home (1924)
The Dangerous Age (1923)
The Gamesters (1920) (as Sidney H. Algier)
The Blue Moon (1920) (as Sidney H. Algier)
The House of Toys (1920)
The Thirtieth Piece of Silver (1920)
Their Mutual Child (1920)
The Week-End (1920) ...  The Weekend (USA)
Six Feet Four (1919) (as Sidney H. Algier)
A Sporting Chance (1919/I) (as Sidney H. Algier)
Some Liar (1919) (as Sidney H. Algier)
The Twinkler (1916) (as Sidney H. Algier)
Dust (1916) (as Sidney H. Algier)
The Inner Struggle (1916) (as Sidney H. Algier)
Reclamation (1916)

Unit manager
Wallaby Jim of the Islands (1937) (as Sid Algiers)

Production manager
A Shriek in the Night (1933)
The Dude Bandit (1933)
The Eleventh Commandment (1933)
The Intruder (1933)
Cowboy Counsellor (1932)
A Parisian Romance (1932)
The Thirteenth Guest (1932) ... a.k.a. Lady Beware
The Boiling Point (1932)
A Man's Land (1932)
Spirit of the West (1932)
The Gay Buckaroo (1932)
Local Bad Man (1932)
Hard Hombre (1931)

Actor
The Wanters (1923) (uncredited) .... bit part
The Dangerous Age (1923)
 A Light Woman (1920)
My Fighting Gentleman ... a.k.a. A Son of Battle (USA) (1917) (as Sid Algier) .... Jim
Under Azure Skies (1916) (as Sid Algier) .... Al, ranch hand
Spider Barlow's Soft Spot (1915) (as Sid Algier) .... Spike

Director
Wild Horse (1931) ... a.k.a. Silver Devil (US: reissue title)

Writer
A Light Woman (1920) (scenario)

References

External links

1889 births
1945 deaths
People from Shamokin, Pennsylvania